Luis Andrés Chicaiza Morales (born 3 April 1992) is an Ecuadorian footballer who plays for Delfín on loan from Liga de Quito.

Club career
He began his career with Mushuc Runa in 2012.

International
He made his Ecuador national football team debut on 1 June 2019, in a friendly against Venezuela, as a starter.

Career statistics

References

External links

1992 births
Living people
Association football midfielders
Ecuadorian footballers
Ecuador international footballers
Ecuadorian Serie A players
Mushuc Runa S.C. footballers
Imbabura S.C. footballers
C.D. Olmedo footballers
C.D. Técnico Universitario footballers
Delfín S.C. footballers
L.D.U. Quito footballers
C.D. Universidad Católica del Ecuador footballers
People from Otavalo (city)
2019 Copa América players